John Gayer (by 1532 – 1571 or later), of St Mawes and Trenbrace in St Keverne, Cornwall, was an English lawyer and politician.

He was a Member (MP) of the Parliament of England for Liskeard in March 1553, for Newport, Cornwall in October 1553, for Penryn in 1559 and for Helston in 1571.

References

16th-century births
Year of death missing
16th-century deaths
English MPs 1553 (Mary I)
English MPs 1553 (Edward VI)
English MPs 1559
English MPs 1571